SS William Paca was a Liberty ship built in the United States during World War II. She was named after William Paca, a signatory to the United States Declaration of Independence from Maryland, a delegate to the First Continental Congress and the Second Continental Congress from Maryland, Governor of Maryland and a United States district judge of the United States District Court for the District of Maryland.

Construction
William Paca was laid down on 13 December 1941, under a Maritime Commission (MARCOM) contract, MCE hull 302, by the Bethlehem-Fairfield Shipyard, Baltimore, Maryland; she was sponsored by Mrs. Carl Abel, the wife of the Captain of the Port of Baltimore, and was launched on 30 May 1942.

History
She was allocated to Calmar Steamship Corp., on 19 June 1942. On 17 November 1948, she was laid up in the National Defense Reserve Fleet, Mobile, Alabama. On 29 August 1969, she was sold for scrapping to Pinto Island Metals Co., for $40,600. She was removed from the fleet on 23 September 1969.

References

Bibliography

 
 
 
 

 

Liberty ships
Ships built in Baltimore
1942 ships
Mobile Reserve Fleet